Mokohinau Islands Lighthouse is a lighthouse on Burgess Island, one of the Mokohinau Islands, which lie off the northeast coast of the North Island of New Zealand. It is owned and operated by Maritime New Zealand. The lighthouse sits at the entrance to the Hauraki Gulf as the landfall light for vessels approaching Auckland from the north and northeast.

The lighthouse was built in 1883 and first lit during June of that year. Its isolated position, approximately 50 km northeast of Cape Rodney makes it one of the most distant lighthouses from the mainland.

During World War II, the lighthouse was turned off as the German destroyer suspected to be in the area laying mines. The lighthouse was not relit until 1947.

In 1980, the lighthouse was fully automated and the lighthouse keepers were withdrawn.  The lighthouse is now monitored remotely from Wellington. The white light flashes every 10 seconds and can be seen for 19 nautical miles (35 km).

See also 

 List of lighthouses in New Zealand

References

External links 
 
 Lighthouses of New Zealand Maritime New Zealand
 Mokohinau Lighthouse in the Auckland War Memorial Museum archives.

Lighthouses completed in 1883
Lighthouses in New Zealand
1880s architecture in New Zealand
Transport buildings and structures in the Auckland Region